Can Go Through Skin (Dutch: Kan door huid heen) is a 2009 Dutch drama film written and directed by Esther Rots. The film is the first feature film by Rots.

Rots won the Golden Calf for Best Montage and Rifka Lodeizen won the Golden Calf for Best Actress at the 2009 Netherlands Film Festival. The whole team behind the film also won the Golden Calf Special Jury Prize.

References

External links 
 

2009 films
2009 drama films
Dutch drama films
2000s Dutch-language films
Films directed by Esther Rots